Bonačić – also occurring in the diaspora variant Bonacic – is a Croatian surname and may refer to:
 Duje Bonačić (1929–2020), Croatian rower
 Filip Bonačić (1911-1991), Croatian water polo player
 John Bonacic (born 1942), American politician
 Luka Bonačić (born 1955), Croatian football coach
 Mirko Bonačić (1903-1989), Croatian footballer
 Ozren Bonačić (born 1942), Croatian water polo player

References

Croatian surnames